Flame of Araby  (a.k.a. Flame of the Desert) is a 1951 American Technicolor adventure film directed by Charles Lamont starring Maureen O'Hara and Jeff Chandler. British film star Maxwell Reed made his American film debut in the picture. Locations were shot at three famous film locations: Vasquez Rocks, Bronson Canyon, and the Alabama Hills in Lone Pine, California.

Plot
Bedouin chief Tamerlaine (Jeff Chandler) is engaged in the hunt for the legendary black stallion Shahzada. Also chasing the prize steed is Tunisian Princess Tanya (Maureen O'Hara), who desires to capture the horse to race in competition against hated brothers Borka (Lon Chaney) and Hakim (Buddy Baer), so she will not be forced to marry one of them. After a prolonged and deadly rivalry, Tamerlaine decides to join forces with Tanya to trap the stallion – and in the process, the two fall in love.

Cast
 Maureen O'Hara as Princess Tanya
 Jeff Chandler as Tamerlane
 Maxwell Reed as Prince Medina
 Lon Chaney Jr. as Borka Barbarossa
 Buddy Baer as Hakim Barbarossa
 Richard Egan as Captain Fezil
 Dewey Martin as Yak
 Royal Dano as Basra
 Susan Cabot as Clio
 Judith Braun as Calu
 Henry Brandon as Mallik

Production
The film was originally known as Flame of the Desert. Maureen O'Hara reportedly requested Chandler as her leading man.

Critical reception
TV Guide noted a "light diversion in the company of fiery redhead O'Hara, with the evil brothers delightfully played by Chaney and Baer."

See also
Raiders of the Seven Seas (1953), with the pirate Barbarossa as a hero

References

External links

Review of film at Variety

1951 films
1950s adventure drama films
American swashbuckler films
American adventure drama films
Films set in Tunisia
Films set in the 16th century
1951 drama films
1950s English-language films
1950s American films